Rolando Ferreira Júnior (born May 24, 1964) is a Brazilian former professional basketball player and coach. At a height of 2.16 m (7'1") tall, he played at the center position.

College career
Ferreira played college basketball at the University of Houston, with the Houston Cougars, for two seasons. As a senior co-captain of the 1987–88 Cougar squad, he averaged 15.8 points per game, and led the team with 6.8 rebounds and 1.6 blocked shots per game. For his efforts, he was named to the 1988 All-Southwest Conference defensive team.

Professional playing career
Ferreira was selected by the Portland Trail Blazers, in the 2nd round (26th overall) of the 1988 NBA Draft. Ferreira played in only one NBA season, as a member of the 1988–89 Blazers. In his NBA career, he played in 12 games, and scored a total of 9 points. He owns the distinction of being the first Brazilian to play in the NBA.

National team playing career
Ferreira was a member of the senior Brazilian national basketball team for 12 years. He played at three FIBA World Cups, in 1986, 1990, and 1994, and at two Summer Olympic Games, in 1988 and 1992. He was also a part of the Brazilian team that won the 1987 Pan American Games, in Indianapolis, over Team USA.

Coaching career
After his playing career ended, Ferreira went on to work as coach at the Universidade Federal do Paraná. Today, he is a basketball coach at the International School Of Curitiba (ISC), in Curitiba-Paraná, Brazil.

External links
Career NBA stats
Article at gazetaesportiva.net 
Chicago Tribune Article

1964 births
Living people
Basketball players at the 1987 Pan American Games
Basketball players at the 1988 Summer Olympics
Basketball players at the 1992 Summer Olympics
Brazilian basketball coaches
Brazilian expatriate basketball people in the United States
Brazilian men's basketball players
1990 FIBA World Championship players
Centers (basketball)
Clube Atlético Monte Líbano basketball players
Esporte Clube Pinheiros basketball players
Esporte Clube Sírio basketball players
Houston Cougars men's basketball players
National Basketball Association players from Brazil
Olympic basketball players of Brazil
Pan American Games gold medalists for Brazil
Pan American Games medalists in basketball
Portland Trail Blazers draft picks
Portland Trail Blazers players
Power forwards (basketball)
Sportspeople from Curitiba
1986 FIBA World Championship players
Medalists at the 1987 Pan American Games
1994 FIBA World Championship players